Barry Brian Little (25 August 1964 – 18 September 1994) was an English professional footballer who played in the Football League as a midfielder.

References

1964 births
1994 deaths
English footballers
Association football midfielders
Footballers from Greenwich
Charlton Athletic F.C. players
Dagenham F.C. players
Barnet F.C. players
Fisher Athletic F.C. players
Dover Athletic F.C. players
English Football League players
National League (English football) players